This is a list of number-one hit singles in 1969 in New Zealand, starting with the first chart dated, 17 January 1969.

Chart

External links
 The Official NZ Music Chart, RIANZ website

1969 in New Zealand
1969 record charts
1969
1960s in New Zealand music